Cauldron of Blood (Original title: El Coleccionista de cadáveres/ The Corpse Collector), also known in USA as Blind Man's Bluff, is a 1967 horror film filmed in Spain and directed by Santos Alcocer, credited as "Edward Mann". The film stars Boris Karloff and Viveca Lindfors. It was filmed in the Spring of 1967, but only released theatrically in 1970 in Spain, a year after Karloff's death. It was later theatrically released in the US by Cannon Films in August, 1971.

Plot
Karloff plays a blind sculptor named Franz Badulescu, who uses the skeletons of actual dead people to create works of art. Unbeknownst to him, his wife is murdering people to provide him with skeletons, and is plotting to eventually kill Franz as well.

Cast
 Jean-Pierre Aumont as Claude Marchand
 Boris Karloff as Franz Badulescu
 Viveca Lindfors as Tania Badulescu
 Dyanik Zurakowska as Elga
 Milo Quesada as Shanghai
 Rosenda Monteros as Valerie
 Rubén Rojo as Pablo
 Carmen Rojo as The Gypsy Queen
 Manuel de Blas as Lenny
 Jaqui Speed as Pilar (as Eduardo Coutelen)
 Mary Lou Palermo as the Stewardess

Release
United Commonwealth/NTA Television purchased US distribution and TV rights from Cannon Films after the U.S. theatrical run. It was released on VHS and region 0 DVD in the United Kingdom only. The DVD included a bonus episode The Silver Curtain from Karloff's 1954 TV series Colonel March of Scotland Yard.

In 2012, Olive Films gave Cauldron of Blood its first-ever U.S. home video release on DVD and Blu-Ray. Olive's release utilized a surviving print from Cannon Films' owner MGM, and produced under licence from U.S. rights' holder Paramount (who obtained those rights from the purchase of Republic Pictures/Spelling Entertainment, which also included the Commonwealth/ NTA library).

References

External links

1971 films
English-language Spanish films
1971 horror films
1970s English-language films